Shelby Houlihan (born February 8, 1993) is an American middle distance runner, Olympian and World Record holder in the 4x1500m relay. She also holds the American record in both the 1500 meters and 5000 meters. Houlihan competed in the 5000m final at the 2016 Summer Olympics in Rio, finishing 11th. She is a 12-time US National Champion winning seven indoor and five outdoor titles in middle-distance events. While at Arizona State University she won the 2014 NCAA 1500m championship.

Personal life
Shelby Houlihan was born in Sioux City, Iowa. Her mother and uncle were both competitive runners, as well as her half-sister.

Houlihan resides in Portland, Oregon.

High school
Houlihan attended East High School in Sioux City. She held high school personal records of 4:43.64 in the one mile run, 2:07.35 in the 800 meter run, and 4:26.39 in the 1500 meter run.  She was the 2011 Iowa Gatorade Player of the Year awards Girls Track and Field Runner of the Year and the 2010 Iowa Gatorade Player of the Year awards Girls Cross Country Runner of the Year. She claimed eight Drake Relays crowns, while also earning the title of Drake Relays Outstanding Female High School Performer for being the first female athlete from a high school to win three events in one year. Houlihan graduated from East in 2011.

NCAA 
Houlihan attended Arizona State University for college. She was the 2014 NCAA champion in the 1500 meters at Arizona State University as a junior. She was the first student at Arizona State University to win a national individual title in the outdoor 1,500.

Houlihan was a 12-time NCAA Division I All-American, the second most in Arizona history, and an NCAA Track champion. She holds Arizona State Sun Devils school records in the 800 meters, 1500 meters, one mile, and 3000 meters.

International 
Houlihan began competing for Nike and the Bowerman Track Club under coach Jerry Schumacher in 2015. She was among seven women who were trained by Schumacher who made it to the Olympics. Houlihan said of her teammates, "After watching all of my teammates make the team, I knew that I could do the same. The prelim felt very easy and gave me a lot of confidence going into the final. I thought the final would most likely be much faster, but I knew I was fit and capable of handling a fast pace." She also stated, "It's just amazing to have teammates be able to push me every day. It's something I've never had before. Even that has put me above and beyond what I've done before. Obviously, I made the right decision for me."

2014 NACAC 
Houlihan qualified for the 2014 North American, Central American and Caribbean Athletic Association Championship in Kamloops, British Columbia, Canada where Houlihan won gold in the 800 meters in 2:03.00 ahead of Rachel Francois and Jenna Westaway.

2016 Olympics 
Houlihan qualified for the 2016 Summer Olympics in the women's 5000 meters after finishing second in the US trials to Molly Huddle. When she finished the race, Houlihan cried. Houlihan said of the moment, "I've been working for that moment my entire life and for it all to come together and happen was one of the most amazing experiences of my life".

Houlihan placed fourth in her heat in the 5000 m preliminary at the Olympics, qualifying her for the final. Houlihan placed 11th in the 5000m final with a time of 15:08.89, finishing as the highest-placing American. After the race, she said, "I didn't place as high as I wanted to, and I've got to take that as a learning step and just try to move forward and make me stronger. I wouldn't have guessed I'd be doing the 5K this year. Ideally, I'd like to stick with it. Once I get the (mileage) volume up and get more aerobically strong, I'm going to be even more of a threat. I'm excited to see where that could take me."

Houlihan's hometown minor league hockey team, the Sioux City Musketeers, honored her after the Olympics with an ovation and ceremonial first puck.

Late 2016 season 
Houlihan placed 6th in 4:23.0 at the 2016 Fifth Avenue Mile.

2017 
Houlihan qualified for the London 2017 World Championships in the women's 5000 meters after winning the 5000 meters at the 2017 USA Outdoor Track and Field Championships. Houlihan ran 15:00.37 to place 3rd in the preliminaries and ran 15:06.40 to place 13th in the final.

2018 
At the 2018 World Indoor Championships, making up more than 10 meters on the final lap, Houlihan passed Fantu Worku to place 5th (8:50.38) in the 3000 meters final and 4th in 4:11.93 at the 1500 meters final for the 2018 IAAF World Indoor Championships after winning the 3000 meters (9:00.08) and the 1500 meters (4:13.07) titles at the 2018 USA Indoor Track and Field Championships in Albuquerque, New Mexico.

On July 21, 2018, Houlihan ran the 5000 m in 14:34.45 in Heusden, Belgium. Assisted by pacer Shalane Flanagan, Houlihan broke Shannon Rowbury's 2016 American record of 14:38.92.

Houlihan placed second in the 1500 m at the 2018 IAAF Continental Cup.

2019 
At the 2019 World Outdoor Championships, Houlihan set a personal best and new American record of 3:54.99 in the final of the 1500m, finishing in 4th place.

2020 
On July 10, at a Bowerman Track Club time trial, Houlihan broke her own American record in the 5000m in a time of 14:23.92, just ahead of teammate Karissa Schweizer in 14:26.34. On July 31st, Houlihan, along with Colleen Quigley, Elise Cranny and Karissa Schweizer established a World Record in the women's 4x1500 meters relay with a time of 16:27.02, eclipsing the previous World Record of 16:33.58 set by a quarter of Kenyan runners on 25 May 2014. The record was ratified in December 2020.

2021 
On January 14, Houlihan received a four-year ban from the sport due to testing positive for nandrolone, an anabolic steroid used to increase muscle mass. Houlihan said the positive result might have come from her eating contaminated pork the night before the test. Houlihan appealed her suspension to CAS, who upheld the ban on June 11. She will be eligible to compete again starting January 13, 2025.

Championship results

See also
List of doping cases in athletics

References

External links

1993 births
Living people
Arizona State Sun Devils women's track and field athletes
Olympic track and field athletes of the United States
Athletes (track and field) at the 2016 Summer Olympics
World Athletics Championships athletes for the United States
Track and field athletes from Iowa
Sportspeople from Sioux City, Iowa
Track and field athletes from Portland, Oregon
American female middle-distance runners
American female long-distance runners
USA Indoor Track and Field Championships winners
USA Outdoor Track and Field Championships winners
Doping cases in athletics
21st-century American women